The Panama tyrannulet or yellow-green tyrannulet (Phylloscartes flavovirens) is a species of bird in the family Tyrannidae. It is endemic to Panama. Its natural habitat is subtropical or tropical moist lowland forests.

References

Panama tyrannulet
Endemic birds of Panama
Panama tyrannulet
Taxonomy articles created by Polbot